Willie Nelson Live (1976) is a reconfigured re-release of the 1966 LP Country Music Concert by Willie Nelson.

Track listing
I Gotta Get Drunk -  2:42
Medley: Mr. Record Man/Hello Walls/One Day at a Time - 5:12
Medley: The Last Letter/Half a Man - 4:27
I Never Cared for You	2:27
Yesterday - 2:55
Touch Me - 2:21
Something to Think About - 2:26
I Just Can't Let You Say Goodbye - 2:39
How Long Is Forever - 2:51
Medley: Opportunity to Cry/Permanently Lonely - 4:40
My Own peculiar Way - 2:30

Personnel

1976 live albums
Willie Nelson live albums